Naryn-Atsagat (Narin Asagad) is a rural locality (a selo) in Zaigrayevsky District, Republic of Buryatia, Russia. The population was 568 as of 2010. There are 6 streets.

Geography 
Naryn-Atsagat is located 28 km north of Zaigrayevo (the district's administrative centre) by road. Pervomayevka is the nearest rural locality.

References 

Rural localities in Zaigrayevsky District